"Je T'aime" (RR: Jyuddemmeu) is a remake song recorded by South Korean singer and Red Velvet member Joy. Originally recorded and released by singer Hey in 2001, the song was re-recorded and was released on May 26, 2021, by SM Entertainment as a pre-release single from her special remake album, Hello. Composed by Yoo Jeong-yeon and written by Lee Do-yeon, the track was reinterpreted from its jazzy vibes to a classical arrangement. It peaked at position 55 on South Korea's Gaon Digital Chart and peaked at position 21 on the Billboard K-Pop Hot 100 Chart.

Background and composition 
According to SM Entertainment, Joy will be releasing a pre-release single, "Je T'aime", for her special remake album Hello on May 26, 2021. A mood sampler, track posters, and teaser images of the song were released through Red Velvet's official social media accounts. The track is a remake of the same name released by singer Hey in 2001."Je T'aime" was composed by Yoo Jeong-yeon, while the lyrics were written by Lee Do-yeon. It was reported that the song was reinterpreted from the track's original "fresh and jazzy vibes" into a "colorful and classical arrangement". The track includes a dance-like piano performance. Moreover, it has an "elegant string melody" that maximizes the "fantastic atmosphere" of the song. The song is composed in the key of D major with a tempo of 111 beats per minute. The lyrics is noted for "Joy's lovely confession with a sweet tone".

Promotion and reception 
A live video for "Je T'aime" was released on May 26, 2021. On June 5, 2021, Joy performed the song on Show! Music Core. The track debuted at position 124 on the 22nd weekly issue of South Korea's Gaon Digital Chart for 2021 during the period dated May 23–29. It peaked at position 55 in the following week. The song also debuted at position 23 on the component Gaon Download Chart and peaked at position 17. It also debuted at position 105 on the Gaon Streaming Chart and peaked at 69. In addition, the track debuted at position 64 on the component BGM chart. The song entered the Billboard K-Pop Hot 100 at position 43 and peaked at position 21 in the following week.

Credits and personnel 
Credits adapted from the liner notes of Hello.

Studio

 Recorded at SM Yellow Tail Studio
 Recorded at MonoTree Studio
 Recorded at Dreamfactory Studio
 Engineered for mix at SM SSAM Studio
 Mixed at SM Concert Hall Studio
 Mastered at 821 Sound Mastering

Personnel

 Joyvocals
 Lee Do-yeonsongwriting
 Yoo Jeong-yeoncomposition
 Hwang Seong-jearrangement, piano, keyboard, programming, strings arrangement, conducting
 ButterFlyvocal directing
 Jeong Dong-yoondrums, percussion
 Bang In-jaeacoustic guitar
 Baek Kyung-jincontra bass
 Park Ki-hoonflute
 Kim Mi-jungstrings
 Kang Hyun-woongstrings
 Kim Shin-hyestrings
 Kim Jae-hyunstrings
 Park Bo-kyungstrings
 Seo Young-wanstrings
 Seo Ji-sookstrings
 Shim Sang-wonstrings
 Yeo Soo-eunstrings
 Lee Su-ahstrings
 Lee Seung-jinstrings
 Jang So-heestrings
 Jang Ji-hyestrings
 Jung Hyun-joostrings
 No Min-jirecording
 Kang Sun-youngrecording
 Lee Pyung-wookrecording
 Seo Mi-raedigital editing
 Kang Eun-jimixing engineer
 Namkoong Jinmixing
 Kwon Nam-woomastering

Charts

Release history

References 

2021 singles
2001 songs
Joy (singer) songs
SM Entertainment singles